"No More Tears" is a song by German recording artist Jeanette. Written by Biedermann, Frank Johnes, Martin Martinsson, and Kristina Bach, it was produced by Thorsten Brötzmann for the limited edition of her second studio album Delicious (2001). Released as a single in February 2002, the ballad peaked at number nine on the German Singles Chart, becoming Jeanette's third non-consecutive top ten hit. It also reached number 15 on the Austrian Singles Chart.

Formats and track listings

Charts

Weekly charts

Year-end charts

References

2000s ballads
2002 songs
Jeanette Biedermann songs
Universal Music Group singles
Songs written by Jeanette Biedermann
Songs written by Kristina Bach